Magenta is a fictional character in the DC Comics' series Teen Titans. She is a former hero turned villain. The character first appeared in The New Teen Titans #17 (March 1982) as Frances Kane, and debuted as Magenta five years later in Teen Titans Spotlight #16 (Nov 1987).

An early concept design for Magenta by George Pérez appeared in DC Sampler #2. The character's initial name was Polara and her color scheme consisted of red and blue rather than magenta and white.

Magenta made her live-action debut in the third season of The Flash, portrayed by Joey King.

Fictional character biography
Frances Kane was Wally West's girlfriend during his Kid Flash days. When Wally was a member of the New Teen Titans, Frances began to have strange experiences, including objects flying around without control. Frances' mother believed that she had been possessed, a theory that gained credence when, during an especially powerful episode, the silhouette of a large horned person appeared. The Titans managed to save Frances, who was thereafter discovered to have magnetic superpowers. Unbeknownst to the Titans, the silhouette had not been a demon, but the magnetically powered supervillain Doctor Polaris, who had been trapped in another dimension by Green Lantern and was trying to use Frances' nascent powers to escape.

Wally pushed her to become "Kid Flash's girlfriend" — a superhero. She became Magenta (a near anagram of "magnet"), and used her powers as Kid Flash's "super girlfriend" and as a Titans ally. The pressure of being a superhero put a lot of stress on her, and the pair broke up. West regretted this in his adult life.

Despite the break-up, Frances still had feelings for Wally (some of them negative), and when the Justice League fought the Teen Titans, Magenta came to help, even using her abilities to jump-start a machine that was vital in saving Earth from massive chunks of debris from a falling planet.

Her heroic efforts masked her growing mental illness. Though Frances was often called "bipolar" (as a darkly humorous pun on her magnetic powers), her illness more closely resembles dissociative identity disorder; all the stress and resentment emerged into a vindictive and aggressive new alter, while her primary alter became unusually weak-willed and mousy. It is notable that similar behavioral changes also appear in Doctor Polaris, though his mental illness apparently predated his super-villain career.

The "new" Magenta forced a confrontation with Wally West (by this time adopting the identity of the third Flash) which quickly devolved into a brawl. When police intervened, she used her powers to rip the fillings from their teeth. Flash was horrified by Frances' nearly homicidal tendencies.

Frances would encounter Wally on and off again many times. In one incident, she was calm and non-violent, realizing that using her powers would awaken her "darker" side. She had to use her powers when another of Flash's enemies teleported a bomb to a computer-determined random location in the city. Frances, riding on Flash's back, was able to detect the bomb with her powers and, risking turning evil, levitate it high enough so its explosion harmed no one. During her time, she formed a friendship with Linda Park, Wally's girlfriend, bonding over things Wally had done in the past.

Later, she would return and attempt to kill the Flash. Using her powers to hijack a car transport vehicle, she raced it through town. She flung car after car at the Flash, who couldn't just dodge the cars because he also had to protect the townspeople from Kane. With the help of Linda, Frances calmed down enough to end her rampage.

Later, when Cicada attacked the Flash, Magenta was an early convert. She was present at the final battle between them, but escaped. She joined Blacksmith's rogues and, after being sexually harassed by Girder, she ripped Girder in half. Her interference allowed Flash the chance to defeat his other adversaries.

In the 2005 "Rogue War" storyline, she was shown as a member of James Jesse's reformed Rogues (alongside Heatwave and the Pied Piper). When they attacked Captain Cold's group, she was defeated by the Weather Wizard.

She was seen among the new Injustice League and is one of the exiled villains in Salvation Run. On Earth, she got involved with the "Cyborg Revenge Squad", a loosely formed group of villains with mastery over metals and cybernetics assembled by the shady Mister Orr, on the behest of Enclave M to capture the cybernetic hero Cyborg and harvest his discoveries and technologies for military uses. Cyborg gave her an electric shock so powerful it brought her back to her senses, unaware of where she was or what she had done but still able to recognize Cyborg.

Magenta appears in the post-Rebirth DC Universe. In the "Flash War" prelude, Wally West is hoping to find people from his past who still remember him, so he approaches Frances Kane. She initially doesn't know who Wally West is, but she suddenly regains her missing memories and reacts violently as Magenta. Wally West manages to calm her down and they reconcile over their shared history.

Powers and abilities
Magenta can generate and control magnetic fields, which she can use to move, lift, and manipulate ferrous metals. She can focus her powers into blasts of concussive magnetic force that can shatter steel, or fire electromagnetic pulses to disrupt electronic systems. She can concentrate her magnetic powers into a protective shield that repels metals and most physical assaults. By surrounding herself with an aura of magnetism that has an equal polarity to the Earth's own geomagnetic field, she can cause the Earth to repel her upward, and thereby fly by magnetic levitation.

In other media
Magenta appears in a self-titled episode of the live-action television series The Flash, portrayed by Joey King. This version was initially a regular orphan who lived with her abusive foster father, John James, and his wife Karen. Due to temporal changes made when the Flash undid the "Flashpoint" timeline and following an encounter with Doctor Alchemy, Kane developed a split personality called "Magenta" and became a metahuman with magnetic capabilities. She attempts to take revenge on John, but the Flash talks her down before his ally Caitlin Snow arranges for Kane to be transferred to a new foster home while John is prosecuted.

References

External links
Profile from "The Flash: Those Who Ride The Lightning" website
Crimson Lightning  - An online index to the comic book adventures of the Flash.

Comics characters introduced in 1982
Fictional characters with dissociative identity disorder
DC Comics female supervillains
DC Comics supervillains
DC Comics metahumans
Fictional characters with electric or magnetic abilities
Characters created by Marv Wolfman
Characters created by George Pérez
Flash (comics) characters